Simanovo is a rural locality (a village) in Oshtinskoye Rural Settlement, Vytegorsky District, Vologda Oblast, Russia. The population was 31 as of 2002.

Geography 
Simanovo is located 67 km southwest of Vytegra (the district's administrative centre) by road. Oshta is the nearest rural locality.

References 

Rural localities in Vytegorsky District